Cholamandalam MS General Insurance Company Ltd (Chola MS) is an Indian insurance firm and a joint venture between the Murugappa Group, an Indian conglomerate, and the Mitsui Sumitomo Insurance Group, a Japanese insurance company.

The firm produces a range of insurance products, including motor, health, accident, engineering, liability, marine, property, travel and rural insurance for individuals and corporate insurance. The company achieved a Gross Written Premium of Rs. 13465 million in 2011 – 12. The company has 93 branches and over 6,000 agents across the country.

The company's motto is 'T3' – 'Trust, Transparency and Technology'.  Chola MS was named the best insurance company in India for "In time Claims Settlement for the year 2011–12" in the Rashtriya Swasthya Bima Yojana scheme run by the Ministry of Labour & Employment, Government of India. IndusInd Bank offers Insurance for individuals as well as corporate customers in association with Chola MS.

The company has also been awarded "Financial Insights Innovation Award" for innovation in mobile enablement – Claims Survey Process at the Asian Insurance Congress held in Singapore in 2011.

Organisational structure

Currently there are around 704 Chola MS employees. This organisational structure is spearheaded by V. Suryanarayanan, managing director.

Awards and recognition
The company has been recognised as the best insurance company for "In time Claims Settlement for the year 2011–12" in the Rashtriya Swasthya Bima Yojana) scheme run by the Ministry of Labour & Employment, Government of India. This award was given for settling the claims in time for the hospitals offering cashless treatment facilities to the below poverty line families in various districts across the country.

References

External links
 

Financial services companies established in 2001
General insurance companies of India
MS&AD Insurance Group
Financial services companies based in Chennai
Murugappa Group
2001 establishments in Tamil Nadu
Indian companies established in 2001